Kalenna Harper (born August 13, 1982) is an American singer-songwriter, television personality, and record producer from Philadelphia, Pennsylvania. She perhaps is best known as a member of the musical duo Dirty Money with Dawn Richard; later joined by label boss Sean "Diddy" Combs to form Diddy − Dirty Money. With the group, they released the critically acclaimed album Last Train to Paris (2010), and 2 additional mixtapes until their disbandment in 2012. From 2014 to 2015, she was a supporting cast member on the VH1 reality series Love & Hip Hop: Atlanta.

Career

2004–09: Songwriting and album appearances
She wrote many songs for other artists, such as Christina Milian's "Peanut Butter & Jelly", Charlotte Church's "Moodswings (To Come at Me Like That)", Aretha Franklin's "Put You Up on Game", Pussycat Dolls' "Painted Windows" and Ciara's "Pucker Up". She was featured on Rasheeda's GA Peach on the track "Pack Ya Bags" and Timati's The Boss on the track "Sexy Bitch". A track leaked in 2008 titled "Kaboom" is a duet between Harper and Lady Gaga recorded during their sessions with Jim Jonsin, before either singer was famous.

Additional credits include, Maino (Don't Say Nothing), Three 6 Mafia (Shake My), Ciara (Kiss My Swag), Trina (Let them Hoes Fight) and Dirty Money (Love Come Down). She's also been featured on the movie soundtracks to "Phat Girls" (Stronger) and "Confessions of a Shopaholic" (Big Spender). "Let Them Hoes Fight" was originally slated to feature Gaga, but solely Harper's vocals ultimately made the record.

2009–12: Diddy-Dirty Money
Harper became a member of a group called Diddy – Dirty Money, which included Harper and former Danity Kane member Dawn Richard. The band worked heavily on Diddy's new album Last Train to Paris. They released three singles in total. "Angels" was the band's debut single and featured The Notorious B.I.G., and was officially released on November 3 (but the song had leaked to the internet in early June). The video was directed by Hype Williams. The band's second single "Love Come Down" was released later that day (November 3). Both singles appeared on Diddy's album Last Train To Paris.

On November 13, a new Diddy-Dirty Money song leaked onto the internet. The song "Hurt" was a demo but officially became known as "Loving You No More," and features Drake. The song is likely to be a track on Last Train To Paris. The band's third single "Hello Good Morning"  featured rapper T.I. and was released on March 30, 2010.

The group has performed on the 2010 BET Awards and nominated for the BET Best Group award. The album's fourth single "Loving You No More" featuring Drake was released on iTunes on September 21, 2010. She also co-wrote a song with Christina Aguilera on the Switch and John Hill production "Bionic" for Aguilera's 2010 fourth studio album, Bionic.

In 2012, the group disbanded. From there, Kalenna returned to making music as a solo artist.

2012–15: Black Orchid, Love and Hiphop Atlanta
Kalenna released a mix-tape called Chamber of Diaries on February 13, 2012, free of charge, consisting of thirteen tracks. The mixtapes lead single, "Go To Work" was released in November 2011.

She is a recurring star in season 3–4 of Love & Hip Hop: Atlanta. During the span of the show, Kalenna released  "Murder" and "Space and Time" on iTunes.

Discography

Studio albums

Mixtapes

As featured artist

As songwriter

Filmography

Television

References

External links

Non-commercial Kalenna mixtapes

African-American women singer-songwriters
American women hip hop singers
American rhythm and blues singer-songwriters
American soul singers
Bad Boy Records artists
Living people
Musicians from Atlanta
Participants in American reality television series
1982 births
21st-century African-American women singers
Singer-songwriters from Georgia (U.S. state)